The 2013 UCF Knights football team represented the University of Central Florida in the 2013 NCAA Division I FBS football season. The Knights were members of the American Athletic Conference (The American), and played their home games at Bright House Networks Stadium on UCF's main campus in Orlando, Florida. The Knights were led by head coach George O'Leary, who was in his tenth season with the team.

The 2013 season marked UCF's first as a member of the American Athletic Conference. The Knights were previously members of C-USA from 2005 to 2012, the MAC from 2002 to 2004, and were an independent from 1996 to 2001. UCF was originally barred from postseason play for the 2012 season due to recruiting violations in both football and basketball under previous athletic director Keith Tribble. The university was able to persuade the NCAA to postpone the postseason ban until the 2013 season, while they filed an appeal. In April 2013, the university won their appeal, the postseason ban was dropped entirely, and the team became bowl-eligible for the 2013–14 season.

The season was one of the most successful in program history, highlighted by six second-half, come-from-behind victories. Four games were won by scores inside the final five minutes, and another was won by a last-second goal line stand, earning the team the nickname the "Cardiac Knights." The Knights secured the program's fifth ten-win season (1990, 2007, 2010, 2012, 2013). It was the fourth such in FBS, as well as the fourth under O'Leary, and the first twelve-win season in school history. Thirteen starters from the 2013 season would later play in the NFL, including two first-round Draft picks.

Quarterback Blake Bortles led the program to its first victories over teams from the Big Ten and Big 12 conferences, by defeating Penn State and Baylor respectively. Bortles also led the Knights to their first win over a Top–10 team, upsetting eighth-ranked Louisville on their homecoming 38–35. The Knights won The American's first football championship under its new name (it had previously been the Big East), and the third conference championship in school history (2007, 2010, 2013). With the championship, UCF earned The American's automatic berth to a BCS bowl game, the first major bowl appearance in school history. The Knights were victorious in the Fiesta Bowl, upsetting the sixth-ranked Baylor Bears 52–42 for the first BCS bowl victory in program history. It was considered one of biggest upsets in BCS history.

Coach (defensive coordinator) Jim Fleming departed the program in December 2013 to become the head coach at Rhode Island and did not coach with the team in their Fiesta Bowl appearance. All games were broadcast live on the UCF-IMG radio network. The Knights flagship station was WYGM "740 The Game" in Orlando.

Schedule
The 2013 schedule was officially released by The American on February 5, 2013. The 2013 schedule was developed as a "bridge" schedule for the 2013 and 2014 seasons, as a permanent system will be developed by the conference to address expanded membership and the creation of divisions by 2015. UCF will face eight conference opponents: UConn, Houston, Louisville, Memphis, Rutgers, SMU, South Florida, and Temple. They are also scheduled to play four non-conference games: Akron (MAC), FIU (C-USA), Penn State (Big Ten), and South Carolina (SEC).

UCF was one of only nineteen FBS schools, and the only member of The American, to not play an opponent from the FCS. The Knights had three bye weeks in the 2013 season: their first during week four, before facing South Carolina, the second during week seven, before facing Louisville, and the third during week ten, before facing Houston.

Personnel

Coaching staff

Roster

Rankings

The Knights entered the season unranked in the preseason polls. The team slowly ascended in both the AP and Coaches' polls receiving votes and finally reaching the top 25 after their key victory at Louisville on October 18. The first BCS standings released in week 8 saw the Knights ranked 23rd. The team also entered the top 25 of the Harris poll the same week. The Knights elevated to 15th in the AP poll two weeks later, their highest individual ranking in school history to date.

Despite winning head-to-head on the road in a nationally televised game, UCF ranked behind Louisville in the Coaches' poll until the final week of the regular season. This drew some ire of media and fans. The team slipped a couple spots in all three polls after their last second, come-from-behind victory at Temple, a game in which they struggled most of the early going. By the end of the regular season, the Knights had rebounded to cement themselves as 15th across the board in the AP, Coaches, and Harris polls. They were ranked 15th in the final BCS standings.

Following their victory in the Fiesta Bowl, the Knights were voted 10th in the final AP poll, and 12th in the final Coaches' poll. It was the highest respective ranking in each poll in school history.

Game summaries

Akron

UCF quarterback Blake Bortles threw for 314 yards and three touchdown passes as UCF rolled past Akron by the score of 38–7. On the second play of the game, Bortles connected with wide receiver Breshad Perriman for a 91-yard touchdown pass, and opened a lead the Knights would not surrender.

Running back Storm Johnson rushed for 99 yards and two touchdowns. Akron avoided a shutout with a "garbage time" touchdown with 42 seconds remaining. With the victory, UCF won their eighth-consecutive season opener.

FIU

Storm Johnson ran for three touchdowns as the Knights blew out FIU 38–0 for their second consecutive victory over the Panthers. With the win, UCF improved to 2–0 for the second time since 1999. Blake Bortles threw for 219 yards and Rannell Hall had four catches for 127 yards in the first half. Storm Johnson had 18 carries for 89 yards and three touchdowns. True freshman quarterback Justin Holman entered the game in the second half. Junior backup quarterback Tyler Gabbert quit the team for academic reasons earlier in the week.

Penn State

Quarterback Blake Bortles threw for 288 yards and three touchdown passes as UCF defeated the Nittany Lions in Happy Valley. The game was the third meeting between the Knights and Nittany Lions, with Penn State winning the previous two games (2002, 27–24; 2004, 37–13). The victory marked UCF's first against a Big Ten opponent, and is also the first time the Knights have started the season 3–0 since 1988. The meeting also reunited Bill O'Brien and George O'Leary, under whom O'Brien was a graduate assistant in 1995, his first season coaching. The two squads are also set to meet in Ireland to open the 2014 season.

On the first drive of the game, Bortles led the Knights 89 yards on 13 plays to score first. Tied at the end of the first quarter, UCF took a 21–10 lead into halftime that they would not surrender. Though Penn State would get one touchdown with 13:55 left in the game, UCF answered with a 36-yard field goal from Shawn Moffitt to get a 10-point lead. Penn State drew within three with 2:51 left, but later fumbled inside UCF territory letting the Knights run out the clock. The Knights gained 507 yards of total offense, the most Penn State has allowed since the 2012 TicketCity Bowl. 34 points is also the most the Nittany Lions have allowed an opponent at home since joining the Big Ten in 1993.

South Carolina

The Knights took a 10–0 lead into halftime. The defense knocked South Carolina quarterback Connor Shaw out of the game with an injured shoulder. In the second half, however, the Gamecocks scored 28 unanswered points, two of the touchdowns off of UCF turnovers. Trailing 28–10, UCF started a rally, with Blake Bortles connecting to Rannell Hall for a 73-yard touchdown reception. With 3:28 left in the game, the Gamecocks fumbled away the ball at the UCF 3 yard line. Bortles connected with Breshad Perriman for a 79-yard reception, and a touchdown to Rannell Hall to make the score 28–25. An onside kick attempt by UCF failed, and South Carolina was able to run out the clock to secure the victory.

Memphis

UCF trailed 17–10 late in the fourth quarter, but pulled off a come from behind victory with two touchdowns in 9 seconds. With 2:05 left in regulation, running back Storm Johnson fumbled at the goal line, but Chris Martin recovered it in the endzone for a UCF touchdown. On the ensuing kickoff, Memphis returner Marquis Warford fumbled the ball as he was tackled by William Stanback. UCF's Drico Johnson scooped up the ball and returned it 12 yards for another touchdown. In the final minute, Memphis drove to the UCF 6 yard line, but quarterback Brandon Hayes was intercepted in the endzone, and the Knights secured a 24–17 victory.

Louisville

The Knights achieved one of the biggest victories in school history against No. 8 Louisville in a nationally televised Friday primetime game on ESPN. UCF won for the first time against a Top–10 team, and earned their first victory over a ranked opponent since an upset of No. 12 Houston in 2009.

Louisville jumped out to a 28–7 lead in the third quarter, behind two touchdown passes by Heisman-candidate Teddy Bridgewater. Late in the third quarter, however, UCF staged a rally that ties the greatest comeback in school history (21). Storm Johnson scored a 1-yard touchdown run to trim the deficit to 28–14. On the next possession, Cardinals running back Senorise Perry fumbled the ball and it was recovered by UCF. One play later, quarterback Blake Bortles completed a short pass to Storm Johnson, who then scrambled across the field for a 30-yard touchdown pass. The score tightened to 28–21. On the next drive, the Knights were able to pin Louisville at their own 15, and eventually forced a punt. On their next possession, UCF went 56 yards in only three plays, scoring yet another touchdown as time was winding down in the third quarter. The Knights scored 21 points in 4:20.

At the start of the fourth quarter, the score was tied 28–28. UCF managed a field goal, and took a 31–28 lead, their first lead of the night. The Knights scored 24 unanswered points, and it was the first time Louisville had trailed in a game all season. With less than seven minutes left in regulation, Teddy Bridgewater led the Cardinals on a 9-play, 88-yard drive, capped off by a 15-yard touchdown run. With the score, Louisville took the lead 35–31 with 3:00 remaining. UCF's final drive went 75 yards in 11 plays, including two third-down conversions. Blake Bortles completed a 2-yard touchdown pass to Jeff Godfrey in the right corner of the endzone with 23 seconds left. With the win, the Knights entered the Top–25 for the first time since 2010.

UConn

UCF quarterback Blake Bortles threw for 286 yards and four touchdown passes, and ran for another touchdown, as the Knights routed winless UConn by the score of 62–17. The Knights led 21–10 early in the second quarter, then exploded for 37 unanswered points, including two touchdowns in the final two minutes of the first half. Bortles was rested in the fourth quarter, and his replacement, Justin Holman threw a touchdown pass of his own. The Knights 45-point victory was its largest win in conference play since first joining the MAC in 2002. After the victory, UCF rose to No. 19 in the AP poll, No. 22 in the Coaches Poll, and remained steady at No. 23 in the BCS standings.

Houston

After a major defensive battle, UCF prevailed 19–14, capped off by a remarkable goal line stand in the final seconds in their Homecoming game over Houston. With the win, the Knights took sole possession of first place in The American, as the only team undefeated in conference play. The game began with two early turnovers by UCF in the red zone. Two field goals by Shawn Moffit gave the Knights a 6–0 lead at halftime, the first scoreless quarters by Houston all season. Houston responded with a touchdown in the third quarter on a 24-yard run by quarterback John O'Korn. UCF quickly responded, as William Stanback rushed for a touchdown to give UCF the lead that held for the rest of the night.

During the fourth quarter, the game took a terrible turn as a hit by Houston's Zachary McMillian took UCF's Breshad Perriman to the ground for nearly fifteen minutes. The play ended with McMillian ejected from the field for targeting. With emotion driving the Knights, they scored again with a 38-yard touchdown run by William Stanback, and took a 19–7 lead. UCF started to see the game slip away, however, as a blocked field goal attempt eventually led to a Houston touchdown by Wayne Beadle, and the lead was trimmed to 19–14. UCF was forced to punt the ball with three minutes left and gave favorable field position to the Cougars. Houston quickly drove the field, and had 1st & Goal at the UCF 10 yard line with 54 seconds left in regulation. Houston had four attempts at a game-winning touchdown, but failed to convert. On 4th & Goal with 20 seconds left, O'Korn's pass was tipped incomplete by junior safety Brandon Alexander, and UCF held on for the victory.

Temple

Knights wide receiver J.J. Worton made a remarkable one-handed diving touchdown catch in the back of the endzone with 1:06 left in regulation, as the Knights rallied for a last-second victory at Temple. The Owls (1–7) were in position most of the afternoon to potentially upset the 15th-ranked Knights. The game saw eleven lead changes, and both teams had combined for 1,175 yards of offense. In UCF football lore, the game became known simply as The Catch.

The Knights scored a safety and field goal in the first quarter. In the second quarter, quarterback Blake Bortles threw a 49-yard touchdown pass to William Stanback to take a 12–7 lead. On the next drive, Storm Johnson broke free for a 73-yard run that set up another touchdown pass, a 4-yard throw to J.J. Worton. The Knights defense, however, was not able to keep Temple at bay. They marched 80 yards in only five plays, and took a 21–19 lead. UCF closed out the first half with a long field goal drive, and a 22–21 lead at halftime. In the third quarter, UCF drove to a 1st & Goal at the Temple 4 yard line. Facing 4th & Goal inside the 1, the Knights failed to convert. Five plays later, Temple burned the Knights with a 75-yard touchdown pass, and a huge swing of momentum.

With less than seven minutes left in regulation, Bortles connected with J.J. Worton for a 38-yard touchdown, and a 29–28 lead. When Temple got ball, their drive was short-lived. Brandon Alexander intercepted P.J. Walker, the first turnover of the game. UCF went three-and-out, however, and managed to take only 54 seconds off the clock. Temple quickly drove 80-yards to a go-ahead touchdown. At the UCF 7 yard line, P.J. Walker scrambled to his left on a busted play to find Chris Parthemore wide open for the score. A two-point conversion made the score 36–29 in favor of the Owls.

Trailing by 7, UCF received the ball with 2:04 left in regulation. Bortles made three straight completions to move to the Temple 30. On 1st & 10 with 1:15 left, Bortles took a shotgun snap, but was immediately under pressure from blitzing linebacker Avery Williams, who was unblocked. Bortles rolled out to his left, and eluded the tackle. He was hit as he threw, but found J.J. Worton deep downfield. It appeared Bortles had overthrown his receiver, but Worton has slipped by the defenders. About 7 yards deep in the endzone, Warton leaped up and made a spectacular, one-handed, diving catch, landing just in-bounds to score the game-tying touchdown with 1:06 left. The play made ESPN's SportsCenter Top 10, and was later named the ESPN Sport Science Newton Award "Best Catch" of the year.

With the score tied 36–36 inside a minute to go, UCF forced Temple into a punting situation with 28 seconds left. Temple punted and UCF got the ball at their own 30. Rather than playing for overtime, Rannell Hall urged Bortles in the huddle to go deep against the Temple defense, which appeared unprepared for the play. On 1st & 10 with 19 seconds left in regulation, Bortles connected on a 35-yard pass to Hall, who broke free for a gain of 64 all the way to the Temple 6 yard line. The offense sprinted up to the line of scrimmage and spiked the ball with 3 seconds left. Kicker Shawn Moffitt made a chip-shot field goal as time expired, and UCF escaped with an improbable 39–36 victory. It was their fourth comeback win of the season.

Rutgers

Quarterback Blake Bortles threw for 335 yards, one touchdown pass, and ran for another touchdown, as UCF routed Rutgers by the score of 41–17. The victory marked the first time in program history that the Knights started a season 9–1, and the first time UCF opened conference play 6–0. Running back Storm Johnson rushed for 75 yards and two touchdowns, and J.J. Worton caught five passes for 117 yards. The game was Worton's third 100-yard receiving game of the season. Breshad Perriman, who sat out the Temple game due to his injury against Houston, returned to make five receptions for 99 yards and one touchdown.

The Knights scored on seven of their first eight possessions, jumping out to an early 21–0 lead. Late in the second quarter, Rutgers executed a fake punt for a gain of 38 yards, which led to their first touchdown of the game. With 41 seconds left in the half, Rutgers blocked a UCF punt, recovering it in the endzone for a touchdown. The Knights took a 28–14 lead into halftime. The second half was all in favor of UCF. A touchdown in the fourth quarter put the game well out of reach, and the Knights lengthened their winning streak to six straight.

South Florida

Despite turning the ball over five times, the Knights found a way to earn their first victory in the I–4 Corridor Clash against South Florida. The team wore their alternate black helmets and black trousers, a gesture to "Black Friday." Running back Storm Johnson fumbled the ball on UCF's first two drives, including a drop at the Bulls 10 yard line. Trailing with under five minutes left in regulation, Blake Bortles found Breshad Perriman for a 52-yard go-ahead touchdown reception. With 1:20 left in the fourth quarter and charging down the field, South Florida quarterback Mike White was intercepted by Jordan Ozerities, and he returned the ball 52 yards to the Bulls 37 yard line. The Knights ran out the clock, and set a program record for best record through eleven games (10–1), and tied school records for best conference start (7–0), and longest win streak (7).

With the victory, UCF earned at least a share of the American Athletic Conference football championship. Six days later, on Thursday December 5, Louisville defeated Cincinnati in The Keg of Nails rivalry. With the Bearcats' loss, the Knights clinched an automatic berth to a BCS bowl game, by virtue of holding a conference head-to-head tiebreaker over Louisville.

The game marked the 400th football game in school history.

SMU

In the coldest game in program history, UCF defeated SMU by the score of 17–13, to win the American Athletic Conference football championship outright, and finished with a then school-best 11–1 regular season record. They earned the school's first perfect conference record (8–0) since joining its first league (MAC) in 2002. Fewer than 1,000 spectators were in the grandstands, after the city of Dallas had been nearly shut down by an ice storm.

SMU took a 10–3 lead into halftime. After a sluggish first half, UCF decided to change tactics, and play "Fastball" in the second half, an up-tempo, no huddle offense. In the third quarter, Blake Bortles led the Knights on two touchdown scoring drives to take the lead for good. With just over eight minutes left in the third quarter, Bortles punched into the endzone with a QB sneak for UCF's first touchdown, and a 10–10 tie. After an SMU field goal, Bortles led the Knights on the go-ahead drive in the waning seconds of the third quarter. Facing 2nd & 10 at the Mustangs 15 yard line, Bortles rolled out to his left, avoided tackles, and ran the ball in just inside the pylon for the go-ahead touchdown.

In the fourth quarter, SMU twice turned the ball over on downs. With eight minutes left in regulation, facing 4th & inches at the UCF 40, quarterback Neal Burcham was tackled short of the line to gain. He was knocked out of the game with a concussion. Burcham's replacement, third-string quarterback Garrett Krstich later threw an interception. In the final two minutes, UCF's defense forced another SMU turnover on downs, and the Knights secured the victory.

Fiesta Bowl

In one of the biggest upsets of the BCS era, the No. 15 Knights stunned the No 6. Baylor Bears. Quarterback Blake Bortles led a potent offense that gained 556 total yards, 301 through the air and 255 on the ground. The Knights never trailed the entire game. Bortles threw for 301 yards, three touchdown passes, and ran for another touchdown. The victory marked the first time in program history that the Knights won a BCS bowl game, and the first time UCF defeated a Top–5 opponent (Baylor was ranked 5th in the Coaches Poll and the final BCS standings). Running back Storm Johnson rushed for 124 yards and three touchdowns. His three touchdown runs tied an individual school record for a bowl game. Rannell Hall caught four passes for 113 yards and two touchdowns.

Entering the game as a 17-point underdog, UCF opened an early 14–0 lead midway through the first quarter. The Bears scored two touchdowns but botched a snap on an extra point to come within one point with eight minutes left in the second. UCF entered halftime up 28–20. Baylor scored quickly after the break, tying the game on a two-point conversion. The Knights responded with a nine-play, 76-yard drive to retake the lead. UCF would not relinquish the lead, growing it to 17-points with 4:44 left in regulation. Baylor quarterback Bryce Petty led the Bears down the field to bring the game within ten points with a minute left, but the Bears failed to recover an onside kick.

Blake Bortles won the offense player of the game award, while Terrance Plummer was named defensive player of the game. The game was the highest-scoring Fiesta Bowl in history (94 points), and the second-highest-scoring BCS bowl ever. First playing football in 1979, UCF became the youngest program to win a BCS bowl game (35 seasons). The game is considered one of biggest upsets of the BCS era.

Awards and milestones

Conference awards
Blake Bortles — American Athletic Conference Offensive Player of the Year
Blake Bortles — Sporting News American Athletic Conference Player of the Year
George O'Leary  — American Athletic Conference Coach of the Year
George O'Leary  — Sporting News American Athletic Conference Coach of the Year

All-Conference Teams
American Athletic Conference First Team: Jordan McCray, Justin McCray, Blake Bortles, Storm Johnson, Terrance Plummer, Jacoby Glenn
American Athletic Conference Second Team: J.J. Worton, Chris Martin, William Stanback, Shawn Moffitt, Clayton Geathers
Sporting News All-AAC Offensive Team: Blake Bortles, Storm Johnson, Jordan McCray, Chris Martin
Sporting News All-AAC Defensive Team: Terrance Plummer, Jacoby Glenn, Clayton Geathers

All-America Teams
Sports Illustrated All-America Team (Honorable mention): Blake Bortles, Terrance Plummer, Shawn Moffitt

American offensive player of the week
September 16: Blake Bortles
October 21: Storm Johnson
November 18: J.J. Worton

American defensive player of the week
September 2: Terrance Plummer
October 7: Terrance Plummer
November 11: Brandon Alexander
December 9: Clayton Geathers

American special teams player of the week
October 28: Shawn Moffitt
December 2: Rannell Hall

National awards and nominations
Fiesta Bowl National Team of the Week — Week of October 20
Manning Award Player of the Week—Blake Bortles
Davey O'Brien Award — Blake Bortles (semifinalist)
Lou Groza Award  — Shawn Moffitt (semifinalist)
Maxwell Football Club Collegiate Coach of the Year — George O'Leary (semifinalist)
Eddie Robinson Coach of the Year — George O'Leary (finalist)
ESPN Sport Science Newton Award: "Best Catch" — J.J. Worton (vs. Temple)

School records
Best record: 11–1 (regular season), 12–1 (final including bowl game)
Best away record: 7-0 (including bowl game)
Best regular season conference record: 8–0
Longest winning streak: 9 games
Most wins by senior class: 38 (2010–2013)
Highest ranking: #15 (BCS), #10 (AP), #12 (Coaches), #15 (Harris)
Most field goals made, season: Shawn Moffitt, 21

Offseason
On January 5, 2014, quarterback Blake Bortles announced that he would forgo his senior season of collegiate eligibility and enter the NFL Draft. Running back Storm Johnson also declared his eligibility for the draft.

NFL draft
Two former players were selected in the 2014 NFL Draft:

Three former players signed as undrafted free agents:

References

UCF
UCF Knights football seasons
American Athletic Conference football champion seasons
Fiesta Bowl champion seasons
UCF Knights football